Malaysian Malay, also known as Standard Malay, , or simply Malay, is a standardized form of the Malay language used in Malaysia and also used in Brunei and Singapore (as opposed to the variety used in Indonesia, which is referred to as the "Indonesian" language). Malaysian Malay is standardized from the Johore-Riau dialect of Malay. It is spoken by much of the Malaysian population, although most learn a vernacular form of Malay or another native language first. Malay is a compulsory subject in primary and secondary schools.

Status

In Malaysia
Article 152 of the Federation designates "Malay" as the official language, but the term "Malaysian" or bahasa Malaysia is used on official contexts from time to time. The choice of name can be politically contentious; in 1999 the Dewan Bahasa dan Pustaka rejected the publication of some short stories as the preface to the publication used the term bahasa Malaysia, not the preferred at the time bahasa Melayu. Between 1986 and 2007, the term bahasa Malaysia was replaced by "bahasa Melayu". Since then, to recognize that Malaysia is composed of many ethnic groups (and not only the ethnic Malays), the term bahasa Malaysia has once again become the government's preferred designation for the bahasa kebangsaan (national language) and the bahasa perpaduan/penyatu (unifying language). However, both terms remain in use, as the terms Malay and bahasa Melayu are still very popular. The language is also referred to as BM.

In Brunei and Singapore
The national standard variety of Malay employed in Brunei largely follows the Malaysian standard, the main differences being minor variation in pronunciation and some lexical influence from Brunei Malay, the local non-standard variety of Malay. Also in Singapore, the Malaysian standard form of Malay is employed.

Writing system

The script of the Malaysian language is prescribed by law as the Latin alphabet, known in Malay as Rumi (Roman alphabets), provided that the Arabic alphabet called Jawi (or Malay script) is not proscribed for that purpose. Rumi is official while efforts are currently being undertaken to preserve the Jawi script and to revive its use in Malaysia. The Latin alphabet, however, is still the most commonly used script in Malaysia, both for official and informal purposes.

Borrowed words

The Malaysian language has most of its borrowings absorbed from Sanskrit, Tamil, Hindustani, Arabic, Persian, Portuguese, Dutch, Sinitic languages, and more recently, English (in particular many scientific and technological terms). Modern Malaysian Malay has also been influenced lexically by the Indonesian variety, largely through the popularity of Indonesian dramas, soap operas, and music.

Grammar

Colloquial and contemporary usage

Colloquial and contemporary usage of Malay includes modern Malaysian vocabulary, which may not be familiar to the older generation, such as:
Awek (means girl, in place of perempuan).
Balak (means guy, in place of jantan).
Cun (means pretty, in place of cantik / jelita).

New plural pronouns have also been formed out of the original pronouns popularly nowadays and the word orang (person), such as:
Korang (kau + orang, "you all", in place of kalian / kamu semua (or hangpa / ampa in Kedahan)).
Kitorang (kita + orang, the exclusive "we", in place of kami).
Diorang (dia + orang, the exclusive "they", in place of mereka (or depa in Kedahan)).

In addition, Arabic terms that is originally used in Standard Malay nowadays has been popularly changed where some of the words and pronunciations in the involved terms have been added by the local conservative Muslims by disputing the terms suggested by the Dewan Bahasa dan Pustaka (DBP), claiming that the involved terms with implementation of the additional words and pronunciations is the real correct terms as same as stated in the Qur'an, where it is predominantly used by the local Muslim netizens in the social medias nowadays. The several involved terms in comparison to Standard Malay that is popularly used, such as:
Ramadhan (means the holy fasting month, in place of Ramadan).
Aamiin (means asking Him to verify the prayer (Du'a); real term is Ameen, in place of Amin).
Fardhu (means obligatory (in Islam), in place of Fardu).
Redha (means accepting, in place of Reda).
Mudharat (means harm, in place of Mudarat).
Dhaif (means poverty, in place of Daif).
Zohor (means mid-day or noon time, in place of Zuhur).
Hadith (means Prophet (Mohamed) terms or speeches, in place of Hadis).

Code-switching between English and Malaysian and the use of novel loanwords is widespread, forming Bahasa Rojak. Consequently, this phenomenon has raised the displeasure of linguistic purists in Malaysia, in their effort to uphold use of the prescribed standard language.

See also
 Comparison of Standard Malay and Indonesian
 Indonesian language
 Jawi, an Arabic script based writing system for Malay
 Language politics
 Malaysian English, English language used formally in Malaysia.
 Varieties of Malay

References

Further reading

External links

 Dewan Bahasa dan Pustaka (Institute of Language and Literature Malaysia, in Malay only)
 Malay Online Web Application with 40 Interactive Free Lessons
 Malay–English Online Dictionary (from Malay to English only) from Webster's Dictionary
 Malay–English Online Dictionary
 The Malay Spelling Reform, Asmah Haji Omar, (Journal of the Simplified Spelling Society, 1989-2 pp. 9–13 later designated J11)
 Pogadaev, V.A., Rott, N. V. Kamus Bahasa Russia – Bahasa Malaysia. Lebih kurang 30 000 perkataan. Moscow: Russky Yazik, 1986

Agglutinative languages

Languages of Malaysia
Standard languages
Subject–verb–object languages